Thomas Hans Willwacher (born 12 April 1983) is a German mathematician and mathematical physicist working as a Professor at the Institute of Mathematics, ETH Zurich.

Biography
Willwacher completed his PhD at ETH Zurich in 2009 with a thesis on "Cyclic Formality", under the supervision of Giovanni Felder, Alberto Cattaneo, and Anton Alekseev. He was later a Junior member of the Harvard Society of Fellows.

In July 2016 Willwacher was awarded a prize from the European Mathematical Society for "his striking and important research in a variety of mathematical fields: homotopical algebra, geometry, topology and mathematical physics, including deep results related to Kontsevich's formality theorem and the relation between Kontsevich's graph complex and the Grothendieck-Teichmüller Lie algebra".

Notable results of Willwacher include the proof of Maxim Kontsevich's cyclic formality conjecture and the proof that the Grothendieck–Teichmüller Lie algebra is isomorphic to the degree zero cohomology of Kontsevich's graph complex.

References

External links
 

Harvard University alumni
Academic staff of ETH Zurich
21st-century German mathematicians
ETH Zurich alumni
1983 births
Living people
Topologists
Mathematical physicists